Chung Uk Tsuen is an at-grade MTR  stop located at Castle Peak Road in Tuen Mun District, near Chung Uk Tsuen. It began service on 18 September 1988 and belongs to Zone 3.

References

MTR Light Rail stops
Former Kowloon–Canton Railway stations
Tuen Mun District
Railway stations in Hong Kong opened in 1988
MTR Light Rail stops named from housing estates